The 1981 season was the Hawthorn Football Club's 57th season in the Victorian Football League and 80th overall.

Fixture

Premiership season

Ladder

References

Hawthorn Football Club seasons